O'Neill Forebay is a forebay to the San Luis Reservoir created by the construction of O'Neill Dam across San Luis Creek approximately  west of Los Banos, California, United States, on the eastern slopes of the Pacific Coast Ranges of Merced County.

Background
A morning-glory type spillway lies at the left bank of the reservoir. The reservoir is fed by the California Aqueduct and the Delta–Mendota Canal. Water from the canal is lifted a vertical distance of  into a channel running  into the forebay.

O'Neill Dam

The drainage area of the reservoir downstream of the San Luis Dam is only . The O'Neill Pumping-Generating Plant stores 28 megawatts hours of energy.

Recreation
The California Office of Environmental Health Hazard Assessment (OEHHA) has developed an advisory for O'Neill Forebay because of mercury and PCBs found in fish caught here. The advisory provides safe eating advice for multiple fish species.

The largest striped bass caught in California was caught in the O’Neill Forebay. The fish,  and weighing , was caught on August 5, 2008, by Frank Ualat of Gilroy, California.

See also
List of dams and reservoirs in California
List of lakes in California

References

External links 

Reservoirs in Merced County, California
Central Valley Project
Reservoirs in California
Reservoirs in Northern California